Buttonwood or Buttonwoods may refer to:

 "Buttonwood", a finance column in The Economist
 Buttonwood Agreement, 1792 effort to organize securities trading that created the predecessor of the New York Stock Exchange

Plants 
 Conocarpus, a genus of flowering plants native to tropical regions of the world
 Platanus, a genus of tree species native to the Northern Hemisphere
 Glochidion, a genus of flowering plants distributed from Madagascar to the Pacific Islands

Places 
 Buttonwood, Pennsylvania, a village along Pennsylvania Route 284
 Buttonwood Corners, New Jersey, an unincorporated community
 Buttonwood Covered Bridge, a covered bridge in the US state of Pennsylvania

Institutions 
 Buttonwood Park Historic District, a historic district in New Bedford, Massachusetts
 Buttonwood Park Zoo, a zoo in New Bedford, Massachusetts
 Buttonwoods Beach Historic District, a historic district in Warwick, Rhode Island
 Buttonwoods Museum, a museum in Haverhill, Massachusetts